The Netherlands Football League Championship 1930–1931 was contested by 50 teams participating in five divisions. The national champion would be determined by a play-off featuring the winners of the eastern, northern, southern and two western football divisions of the Netherlands. AFC Ajax won this year's championship by beating Feijenoord, PSV Eindhoven, Go Ahead and Velocitas 1897.

New entrants
Eerste Klasse North:
Promoted from 2nd Division: Meppeler Sport Club
Eerste Klasse South:
Promoted from 2nd Division: De Valk
Eerste Klasse West-I:
Moving in from West-II: HVV 't Gooi, Hermes DVS, Koninklijke HFC, Stormvogels, VUC and ZFC
Eerste Klasse West-II:
Moving in from West-I: ADO Den Haag, RCH, FC Hilversum, Sparta Rotterdam and VSV
Promoted from 2nd Division: KFC

Divisions

Eerste Klasse East

Eerste Klasse North

Eerste Klasse South

Eerste Klasse West-I

Eerste Klasse West-II

Championship play-off

References
RSSSF Netherlands Football League Championships 1898-1954
RSSSF Eerste Klasse Oost
RSSSF Eerste Klasse Noord
RSSSF Eerste Klasse Zuid
RSSSF Eerste Klasse West

Netherlands Football League Championship seasons
Neth
Neth